It Happens Every Spring is a 1949 American comedy film directed by Lloyd Bacon and starring Ray Milland, Jean Peters and Paul Douglas.

Plot
A college professor is working on a long-term scientific experiment when a baseball comes through the window, destroying all of his glassware and spilling the fluids that the flasks and test tubes contained. The pooled fluids combine to form the chemical "methylethylpropylbutyl," which then covers a large portion of the baseball. The professor soon discovers that the fluid, along with any object with which it makes contact, is repelled by wood (cf. Alexander Fleming's serendipitous discovery of penicillin).

Suddenly, he realizes the possibilities and takes a leave of absence to go to St. Louis to pitch in the big leagues, where he becomes a star and propels his team to the World Series.

Cast 
 Ray Milland as Prof. Vernon K. Simpson / King Kelly (not based on the 19th-century ball player Mike "King" Kelly)
 Jean Peters as Deborah Greenleaf
 Paul Douglas as Monk Lanigan
 Ed Begley as Edgar Stone
 Ted de Corsia as Jimmy Dolan
 Ray Collins as Prof. Alfred Greenleaf
 Jessie Royce Landis as Mrs. Greenleaf
 Alan Hale Jr. as Schmidt
 William Murphy as Tommy Isbell (as Bill Murphy)

Production
Alan Hale, Jr. has a small role as a catcher on the college baseball team.

Although the home team is "St. Louis", and both St. Louis major league teams (the Cardinals and the Browns) played at Sportsman's Park at the time, the exteriors for the movie were filmed in Los Angeles' Wrigley Field, which was built to resemble Wrigley Field in Chicago.

A novelization of the film was written by Valentine Davies.

Reception
New York Times critic Bosley Crowther found the film trying, particularly Valentine Davies's "monotonous" script. He did have measured praise for Paul Douglas, however.

Leonard Maltin gives the film three and a half stars, calling it “a most enjoyable, unpretentious picture”.

See also
 List of American films of 1949

References

External links
 
 
 
 
 It Happens Every Spring at the Movie Review Query Engine
 The Internet Archive holds a radio adaptation of the film, originally broadcast  on October 3, 1949 by Lux Radio Theater.

1949 films
1940s science fiction comedy films
20th Century Fox films
American baseball films
American black-and-white films
American science fiction comedy films
American sports comedy films
Films directed by Lloyd Bacon
Films set in universities and colleges
Films set in St. Louis
1940s sports comedy films
1949 comedy films
Films produced by William Perlberg
1940s English-language films
1940s American films
Films about Major League Baseball